Riyad Bank is one of the largest financial institutions in Saudi Arabia, ranked fourth in assets It was established in 1957. The Saudi government owns 51% of the shares of the firm.

As other Saudi commercial banks, Riyad Bank is supervised by the Saudi Central Bank.

In March 2018, Riyad Bank launched contactless payment wristbands, using the Gemalto digital security solution.

In December 2018, Riyad bank went into preliminary discussions with National Commercial Bank (NCB), the country's biggest lender by assets, to study a merger plan. After three weeks Riyad Bank hired Goldman Sachs to advise on the merger that would create the largest bank in the kingdom with $182 billion in combined assets.

See also 

 List of banks in Saudi Arabia

References 

1957 establishments in Saudi Arabia
Banks established in 1957
Companies listed on Tadawul
Companies based in Riyadh
Islamic banks of Saudi Arabia
Banks of Saudi Arabia